New Democratic Front is a name given to several political parties. It may refer to:
 New Democratic Front (Sri Lanka), a Sri Lankan political party
 New Democratic Front (Botswana), a Batswana political party